Alexander Deans (born May 1, 1997) is a Canadian-British inventor. At age 12, he created the "iAid", a navigation device for the blind which won the 2013 Canada-Wide Science Fair in the intermediate category and several awards at the 2014 Intel International Science and Engineering Fair.

In 2017, Deans became Her Majesty Queen Elizabeth II's Youth Leader for Canada at Buckingham Palace. In 2014, Deans was one of twelve Canadians named on Maclean's magazine's list of Future Leaders under 25. In 2015, Deans accepted naming rights to a minor planet from MIT Lincoln Laboratory. Since 2014, Deans has been a speaker at WE Day events across North America for 160,000 youth alongside Nick Jonas and Queen Noor of Jordan.

Early life 
Alexander Matthew Deans was born on May 1, 1997 in Windsor, Ontario, Canada to  Robin Deans and Joan Deans. He has an older sister Nicola, and a younger brother, Marcus. Alex's father spoke of his childhood that he "was never really pushed to achieve in academics or competition. Instead, from a very young age, he was allowed to go out, play, and find and make things on his own". Deans was raised in Windsor, Ontario and attended Académie Ste Cécile International School in South Windsor for primary and secondary school. He speaks English and French. He studied chemical engineering at Mcgill University.

In 2010, Deans competed at the Canada-Wide Science Fair in Peterborough, Ontario with a project entitled "Saline Aqua Genesis. The innovation used a salt gradient solar pond to drive a generator for electricity production and distilled water for purification purposes in developing countries, but was unsuccessful at the fair.

Inventions

iAid 
At a competition in Charlottetown, Prince Edward Island, Deans demonstrated the iBELT, an invention to aid visually impaired users. The device used echolocation-like technology to map the user's environment and plan paths to destinations, directing users through audible feedback.

Deans credits an encounter he had at age 12 with a visually impaired woman as his inspiration to create iAid. He noticed that she was struggling to cross the street and "asked if she needed any help and realized that she was visually impaired. I saw that she didn't have any independence and couldn't navigate well." Deans taught himself to code, combining his knowledge of bat echolocation with robotics to create iAid prototypes. In an interview with CTV Canada AM anchor Marci Ien in June 2015, Deans remarked that "nature is an incredible innovator," and aimed to mimic bat echolocation through the development of the iAid.

Deans' refinement of the device, which he renamed "iAid", was presented in Lethbridge, Alberta in 2013.  The reworked model incorporated GPS planning, outdoor navigation aids, and tactile feedback through use of an innovative joystick. The device won Deans both the fair and funding from corporations including Youth Science Canada and BlackBerry. The model was continually tested at the Canadian National Institute for the Blind with the visually impaired community to garner feedback.

iAid utilizes ultrasonic scanning capabilities to compile a map of the user's surroundings and identify obstacles up to 3.5 meters away. The device directs the user through an intuitive hand-held joystick which swivels automatically to indicate directions to destinations. Distances to destinations are relayed via a tilt bracket in the joystick. Outdoors, the user can make use of iAid's Bluetooth pairing capabilities with cell phones. iAid then avails of Google Maps, compass, GPS, and cloud services to plan pedestrian routes and store them for future reference. Deans is testing iAid  with groups from the Canadian National Institute for the Blind and collaborated with the Foundation Fighting Blindness for technology input.

VP: Virtual Passenger/ "Call Me Out" 
In early 2017, Deans started working with McCann Erickson and Chevrolet to create a new technology, VP,  to stop teens from texting and driving. VP (Virtual Passenger) brings celebrities and friends into the automobile via Chevrolet's existing MyLink onboard system when the driver receives a text. The system can analyze driving and texting habits using this technology. Virtual Passenger debuted at the Cannes Lions International Festival of Creativity in June 2017. The technology was renamed to "Call Me Out" prior to release in August 2018.

Recognition 
In early 2014, Deans was one of twelve named as a "Future Leader under 25" by Maclean's magazine, described as an "elite group of young people who are outstanding in their fields." Deans' work was recognized by Governor General David Johnston in April of that year in a speech at the Milken Institute Global Conference Canadian CEO Dinner in Los Angeles, California. Later that year, Deans won second prize at the Intel International Science and Engineering Fair in Los Angeles, California. The Lincoln Laboratory at MIT offered him naming rights to a minor planet at 16 years old. The iAid was named as one of the "Top 50 Ideas Worldwide for Technology in Health, Energy, and Medicine" that same year by a judging panel representing the Organization of American States.

In June, the iAid began exhibiting at the Ontario Science Centre in the Weston Family Innovation Centre. In October, Deans became Royal Bank of Canada's official ambassador for its ChangeAgents program, partnering with Canadian band Hedley to promote the project. Deans spoke at several We Day events across Canada that year alongside Demi Lovato and Prime Minister Justin Trudeau to 160,000 youth, including in Toronto and Vancouver in a segment including Hedley and at Ottawa, Winnipeg, and Calgary.  In 2015, Deans was awarded a Schulich Leader Scholarship to study Engineering at McGill University. In 2016 and 2017, Deans partnered with ACCO Brands and MeadWestvaco for a digital campaign with Five Star to promote creativity.

In the summer of 2017, Deans spoke with Prince Harry and John Major at 10 Downing Street around developing the next generation of leaders.

Other Work 
Deans is known to be an avid artist, frequently referencing portraiture as a source of his creativity. While finger-painting a portrait of Steve McCurry's Afghan Girl, he realized how sensitive his hands were, which influenced the joystick component of iAid,  as the feedback mechanism is primarily haptic feedback to the hands. Deans has displayed his portraiture in television and news interviews, as well as public speaking engagements.

Deans has been an alpine skier since age 2. In 2011, he was selected to compete for Team Canada at the International Children's Games, organized by the International Olympic Committee.

References

1997 births
Living people
Sportspeople from Windsor, Ontario
21st-century Canadian inventors
Canadian motivational speakers
McGill University people
Canadian male alpine skiers